This article details Millwall's 2008–09 season in League One, Millwall's 83rd season in the Football League and 40th in the third tier.

Events
This will be a list of the significant events to occur at the club during the 2008–09 season, presented in chronological order.

9 August 2009- season begins with a 4–3 loss at Oldham.

12 August 2009- Knocked out in the First Round of the League Cup at home to Northampton.

Players

Squad information

Appearances (starts and substitute appearances) and goals include those in the League One (and playoffs), FA Cup, League Cup and EFL Trophy.

Squad stats

Disciplinary record

Players in and out

In

Out

Club

Kits

Competitions

Overall

League

Table

Play-offs

Results summary

Results by round

Results

FA Cup

Football League Trophy

League Cup

References

External links
Official Website
Sky Sports
BBC Football

2008-09
2008–09 Football League One by team